Kibatalia villosa is a species of plant in the family Apocynaceae. It is found in Indonesia and Malaysia.

References

villosa
Vulnerable plants
Taxonomy articles created by Polbot